At least three ships of the French Navy have been named L'Adroit:

 , a  launched in 1927 and sunk in 1940.
 , a  launched in 1938 as Épée, she was renamed in 1941 and scuttled in 1942
 , a  sold to Argentina in 2018 and renamed ARA Bouchard

French Navy ship names